Adam Lapšanský (born 10 April 1990) is a Slovak professional ice hockey player who currently playing for HK Dukla Michalovce of the Slovak Extraliga.

Career statistics

Regular season and playoffs

International

Awards and honours

References

External links

 

Living people
HK Poprad players
MHK Kežmarok players
HC Sparta Praha players
Piráti Chomutov players
HC Litvínov players
HC Stadion Litoměřice players
HC Slovan Ústečtí Lvi players
HC Košice players
Indy Fuel players
Ravensburg Towerstars players
HC Karlovy Vary players
HK Dukla Trenčín players
Bratislava Capitals players
Slovak ice hockey forwards
1990 births
Sportspeople from Spišská Nová Ves
HK Dukla Michalovce players
Slovak expatriate ice hockey players in the Czech Republic
Slovak expatriate ice hockey players in Germany